The Nikon D3000 is a 10.2-megapixel DX format DSLR Nikon F-mount camera announced by Nikon on 30 July 2009. It replaces the D40 as Nikon's entry level DSLR. It features a 3.0-inch 230,000-dot resolution LCD monitor, CCD sensor with ISO 100–1600 (3200 with Boost) and 3D tracking Multi-CAM1000 11-point AF system which makes it quite similar to the Nikon D200 in these main parts. Initially priced with $599 MSRP, actual prices are much lower.

The D3000 was superseded by the D3100 on August 19, 2010. The D3000 is the final Nikon DSLR to use a CCD sensor.

Features 

 

 Nikon's 10.2-megapixel Nikon DX format CCD sensor.
 Nikon EXPEED image processor.
 Camera assisted "Guide" mode.
 Active D-Lighting.
 Sensor cleaning.
 3.0-inch 230,000-dot resolution fixed TFT LCD
 Continuous Drive up to 3 frames per second.
 3D Color Matrix Metering II with Scene Recognition System.
 3D Tracking Multi-CAM 1000 autofocus sensor module with 11 AF points.
 ISO sensitivity 100 to 1600 (3200 with boost).
 Nikon F-mount lenses.
 i-TTL flash exposure system without built-in wireless control.
 File formats: JPEG, NEF (Nikon's RAW, 12-bit compressed)
 SD and SDHC memory card file storage.

Like the Nikon D40, D40x, D60 and D5000, the D3000 has no in-body autofocus motor, and fully automatic autofocus requires a lens with an integrated autofocus-motor. With any other lenses the camera's electronic rangefinder can be used to manually adjust focus.

Can mount unmodified A-lenses (also called Non-AI, Pre-AI or F-type) with support of the electronic rangefinder and without metering.

Reception
Reviews of Nikon D3000 have been generally positive, noting that the image quality of the D3000 is comparable to more expensive 10 megapixel cameras, while recognizing certain weaknesses such as the lack of live view and HD movie capabilities or movie capabilities in general.

Image noise compared to the Canon EOS 1000D / Rebel XS and Sony a230 was rated best in terms of remaining details by Cameralabs.

See also
List of Nikon F-mount lenses with integrated autofocus motors

References

External links

 Nikon D3000 – Nikon global website
 Nikon D3000 Microsite
 hands on preview at ePHOTOzine.com

D3000
D3000
Cameras introduced in 2009
Cameras made in Thailand